Stringtown is a small, unincorporated community located along the Stringtown Road near Belington in Barbour County, West Virginia, United States. It traces its route from east to west beginning on West Virginia Route 92, until it intersects with Cross Road, which exits back onto WV 92, then turns south until it intersects with Laurel Mountain Road. On the way, it also intersects with Hunters Fork Road, which travels north and also empties back onto WV 92.

References

Unincorporated communities in Barbour County, West Virginia
Unincorporated communities in West Virginia